While Broken Hearts Prevail is an EP by rock band Emery that was released on October 28, 2008. Musically the album returns to heavier sound found on Emery's debut album The Weak's End instead of the alternative sound on the band's previous release I'm Only a Man.

"The Smile, the Face" and "Edge of the World" would later appear on ...In Shallow Seas We Sail. "Always Depends" is a re-recording of a track from the band's debut EP The Columbus EEP Thee.

Track listing

Personnel 
Credits adapted from album’s liner notes.

Emery
Toby Morrell – vocals, bass
Devin Shelton – vocals, bass
Matt Carter – guitar, backing vocals
Josh Head – screaming vocals, keyboards, synthesizers, programming, percussion
Dave Powell – drums, percussion

Production
Matt Carter – engineer, producer
Matt Talbott – additional recording
David Bendeth – mixing
Dan Korneff – mixing
Toby Morrell – assistant mixing
Troy Glessner – mastering
Ryan Clark – design
Emery – art Direction
Marc Johns – cover art
Scott Andrews – handwriting, management
Greg Lutze – band photo
Jon Dunn – A&R

References 

2008 EPs
Emery (band) EPs
Tooth & Nail Records EPs